Elections to the French National Assembly were held in French Somaliland on 2 January 1956 as part of the wider French parliamentary elections. Harbi Farah Mahamoud was elected as the territory's MP.

Results

References

French Somaliland
1956 in French Somaliland
Elections in Djibouti
January 1956 events in Africa